Peter L. Warrick (born June 19, 1977) is an American former college and professional football player who was a wide receiver in National Football League (NFL) for six seasons. He played college football at Florida State University, and was recognized a consensus All-American twice. He was drafted by the Cincinnati Bengals fourth overall in the 2000 NFL Draft, and played professionally for the Bengals and Seattle Seahawks of the NFL, and the Bloomington Extreme of the Indoor Football League (IFL).

Early years
Born in Bradenton, Florida, Warrick attended Southeast High School in Bradenton, where he played high school football, basketball and ran track. He played wide receiver as a junior, and caught 36 passes for over 600 yards and nine touchdowns. He played quarterback as a senior, rushing for 673 yards and 13 touchdowns, while completing 49 of 96 passes for 1,109 yards and 13 scores. He also returned four punts for touchdowns during his junior and senior seasons. He served as team captain and led Southeast High in Bradenton to two consecutive state titles. He was USA Today honorable mention, Parade All-American and first team class 5A All-State. In basketball, he was named the Player of the Year in the state of Florida.

In track & field, Warrick was one of the state's top performers in the sprinting and jumping events. He was the state runner-up in the long jump as a junior, at 7.16 meters. He won two state 6-A titles in the long jump as a senior, recording a personal-best jump of 7.25 meters. He ran a career-best time of 10.59 seconds in the 100 meters at the Regional 5-A State Meet. He was chosen All-area first-team in the 100m and long jump events.

Recruiting
Considered by some to be the nation's best high school wide receiver, Warrick was, according to National Recruiting Advisor, the No. 1 wide receiver and No. 7 player in the nation. He chose to attend FSU over scholarship offers from several other major programs.

College career
Warrick received an athletic scholarship to attend Florida State University, and played for coach Bobby Bowden's Florida State Seminoles football team from 1995 to 1999. He primarily played wide receiver and returned punts, leading Florida State to BCS National Championship Game appearances in 1998 and 1999. During the 1999 season, Florida State was the first team in college football history to rank first in the polls throughout the season and end with the number one ranking in the country. Warrick was recognized as a consensus first-team All-American, and the MVP of the 2000 Sugar Bowl with over 160 yards receiving and three touchdowns, including a 59-yard punt return. Warrick graduated from Florida State with a Bachelor of Science degree in political science in 1999.

College Stats and Awards
Rushing and receiving statistics by year.

Punt, kick return, and all-purpose yardage statistics by year.

Averaged 127.3 All Purpose as a Senior
Awards
1998:
NCAA Consensus All-American
Associated Press - First-team All-American
Walter Camp Football Foundation - First-team All-American
The Sporting News - First-team All-American
Football Digest - First-team All-American
Football News - Second-team All-American
First-team All-ACC

1999:
NCAA Consensus All-American
Walter Camp Football Foundation - First-team All-American
Football Writers Association of America - First-team All-American
Football News - First-team All-American
The Sporting News - First-team All-American
Associated Press - First-team All-American
All-American Foundation - First-team All-American
American Football Coaches Association - First-team All-American
First-team All-ACC

Dillard's department store incident
On September 29, 1999, during Warrick's senior season at Florida State, Warrick and teammate Laveranues Coles went to Dillard's in the Tallahassee Mall and bought $412.38 worth of clothing for $21.40—a discount so large that it is considered shoplifting under Florida law. An off-duty officer saw what happened through a surveillance camera. Warrick, Coles and the clerk, Rachel Myrtil, were arrested for grand theft. On October 22, Warrick pleaded guilty to misdemeanor petty theft in connection with the department store scam. At that year's rivalry game between the Florida Gators and Florida State, Gators fans brought Dillard's bags to Florida Field in order to mock Warrick. Florida State won the game, 30–23.

At the time of his arrest, Warrick was widely considered the frontrunner for the Heisman Trophy with 36 catches for 508 yards and four touchdowns on the season. Following the arrest, Florida State suspended Warrick for two games, since school rules prevented him from playing while criminal charges were pending. The two-game suspension, along with the negative publicity he received in the national media, ended any chance for Warrick to be awarded the Heisman Trophy. At season's end, Warrick was not invited to the award presentation at the Downtown Athletic Club, and finished sixth in the overall voting.

Professional career

Cincinnati Bengals
In his first 3 seasons with the Bengals, Warrick never gained more than 667 receiving yards. In 2003, Warrick caught a career-high 79 passes for 819 yards and 7 touchdowns, while gaining 143 rushing yards and adding another 273 yards and a touchdown returning punts.

Warrick missed most of the 2004 season with an injury, and receiver T. J. Houshmandzadeh, a 7th round pick in the 2001 draft, replaced him at the #2 receiver spot and ended up having the best season of his career. Warrick was released from the Bengals before the start of the 2005 season.

Seattle Seahawks
Warrick subsequently signed with the Seattle Seahawks. In his first season with Seattle, Warrick was used infrequently in the starting lineup. He finished the season with 11 catches for 180 yards, 1 carry for 5 yards, and 6 punt returns for 29 yards. However, for most of the postseason and in Super Bowl XL, Warrick served as the team's starting punt returner. His 12-yard punt return in the first quarter of the Super Bowl helped set up the Seahawks' first points of the game. Later he had a 34-yard return, negated by a penalty. He finished Super Bowl XL with 4 punt returns for 27 yards.

On September 2, 2006, Warrick was cut from the Seahawks after the preseason. The New York Giants worked him out on November 13, as did the Bengals later in the year, but both teams opted to pass on him as well.

Las Vegas Gladiators
On January 4, 2007, the Las Vegas Gladiators of the Arena Football League signed Warrick. Per club policy, terms of the deals were not disclosed. Warrick was a no-show after the AFL's Week 1, and was placed on the "refused to report" list by the team. Warrick did not work out with any teams in 2007, though Miami, Carolina, Jacksonville, and the New York Jets reportedly all contacted Warrick's agent about potential workouts.

Montreal Alouettes
In May 2008, Warrick was signed by the Montreal Alouettes of the Canadian Football League. He was released on June 3.

Bloomington Extreme
In 2009, Warrick was signed by the Bloomington Extreme of the Indoor Football League.
He only played for one season.

Cincinnati Commandos
In 2011, Warrick signed with the Cincinnati Commandos of the Continental Indoor Football League. He never played in a single game for the Commandos.

NFL statistics

References

External links
 Florida State Seminoles bio

1977 births
Living people
All-American college football players
American football wide receivers
American football return specialists
Bloomington Extreme players
Sacramento Mountain Lions players
Cincinnati Bengals players
Cincinnati Commandos players
Florida State Seminoles football players
Las Vegas Gladiators players
Montreal Alouettes players
Sportspeople from Bradenton, Florida
Seattle Seahawks players